SM U-11 or U-XI was a  in the Austro-Hungarian Navy ( or ) during World War I. She was originally a German Type UB I submarine commissioned into the German Imperial Navy as SM UB-15.

SM UB-15 was constructed in Germany and shipped by rail to Pola, where she was assembled and launched. She was commissioned into the German Imperial Navy in April and sank an Italian submarine in June. The boat was handed over to Austria-Hungary and commissioned as SM U-11 on 14 June. In early 1916, U-11 fired on a British submarine, but missed. After the end of the war, U-11 was handed over to Italy as a war reparation and scrapped at Pola by 1920.

Design and construction 
U-11 was a small coastal submarine that displaced  surfaced and  submerged. She featured a single shaft, a single  Körting diesel engine for surface running, and a single  electric motor for submerged travel. She was designed for a crew of 17 officers and men.

U-11 was equipped with two  torpedo tubes located in the front and carried a complement of two torpedoes. German Type UB I submarines were additionally equipped with a  machine gun, but it is not clear from sources if U-11a former German boatwas fitted with one, or if it was, retained it in Austro-Hungarian service. In October 1916, U-11s armament was supplemented with a /18 (2.6 in) gun.

UB-15 was laid down on 9 November 1914 at AG Weser in Bremen. The submarine was shipped by rail in sections to Pola Navy Yard, where the sections were riveted together. There is no known surviving record of how long it took for UB-15's sections to be assembled. However, a similar ship was built in two weeks.

Operational history

UB-15
SM UB-15 was commissioned into the German Imperial Navy under the command of Oberleutnant zur See Heino von Heimburg on 11 April. An Austro-Hungarian Navy officer was assigned to the boat for piloting and training purposes. On 10 June, UB-15 sank the Italian submarine Medusa for a loss of 245 tons off Porto di Piave Vecchia in the Northern Adriatic. Like all Type UB I and U-10 class submarines, UB-15 was equipped with compensating tanks designed to flood and offset the loss of one of the  C/06 torpedoes. However, they did not always function correctly; when firing from periscope depth the boat could broach after firing or, if too much weight was taken on, plunge to the depths. When UB-15 torpedoed and sank Medusa, the tank failed to properly compensate, forcing all of the crewmen to run to the stern to offset the trim imbalance and prevent the ship from sinking.

U-11
On 18 June, UB-15 was handed over to the Austro-Hungarian Navy and commissioned as U-11 under the command of Linienschiffsleutnant Lüdwig Eberhardt. U-11 retained its German crew until 18 June 1916, when they were replaced by an all Austro-Hungarian one. In early 1916, U-11 unsuccessfully attacked the British submarine  in the Gulf of Fiume. U-11 captured one ship in her Austro-Hungarian service, and was handed over to Italy as a war reparation and scrapped at Pola by 1920.

Summary of raiding history

Notes

References

Bibliography 

 

 

 
 
 

Ships built in Bremen (state)
Ships built in Pola
U-boats commissioned in 1915
World War I submarines of Germany
U-10-class submarines
World War I submarines of Austria-Hungary